Hakim's Tomb ("Hakeemon ka Maqbara") is a 16th-century tomb located in the city of Hasan Abdal, Pakistan, across from the Gurdwara Panja Sahib. The tomb complex also includes the Tomb of Lala Rukh, traditionally attributed to a Mughal princess. The tomb was built for two doctors (Hakims) to the Mughal court, the brothers Hakim Abdul Fateh Gilani Masiuddin, and Hakim Humayun Khwaja Gilani.

History
The tomb was ordered to be built by the Mughal emperor Akbar's minister and superintendent of construction, Khawaja Shamsuddin Khawafi. Khwaja had intended the tomb to be built for himself between 1581 and 1583, but the two royal Hakimss were buried there at the command of Emperor Akbar in 1597. Akbar visited the site after returning from one of his trips to Kashmir.

Architecture
The tomb is octagonal and is a two-story structure. A large Persian style iwan gateway arch  is found on each of the cardinal sides of the tomb, and span the height of both story. Flanking the large iwans are 4 smaller niches - also built in the Persian style. The tomb is fronted by a small fish pond.

References 

Buildings and structures in Punjab, Pakistan
Mausoleums in Punjab, Pakistan
Monuments and memorials in Punjab, Pakistan
History of Punjab
Mughal tombs